Liang Style Baguazhang is the style of Baguazhang descended from Liang Zhenpu, the youngest disciple of Baguazhang's founder, Dong Haichuan. In general, most lineages of Liang style descend from either Guo Gumin or Li Ziming:

Dong Haichuan
Liang Zhenpu
An Guoliang
Chen Delu
Da Mingliang
Dong Wenxiu
Fu Zhenlun
Gao Qisheng
Gao Qinfeng
Gao Qingyung
Geng Ziyu
Guo Gumin
Gao Ziying
Gao Jiwu
Yang Bao
Shao Jinzhang
Gao Ziwu
Hu Zibin
Jia Yian
Li Ziming
Ma Chuanxu (eldest disciple)
Vince Black
Di Guoyong
Byron Jacobs
Li Gong Cheng
Ong Ming Thong 
Ling Changyong
Shi Xingbao
Ma Ling
Sui Yunjian
Sun Hunyan
Wang Tong
Geoff Sweeting
Wang Shitong
Yang Jiacang
Zhang Huasen
Zhang Quanliang
Zhao Dayuan
Zhuoteng Jinbinwei
Li Jinhua
Li Jingbao
Li Mengrui
Li Tongtai
Li Wancai
Liu Huating
Liu Baoding
Liu Hegui
Lu Ermazi
Ma Laopang
Qin Laodu
Su Sanpang
Tian Zhenfeng
Wang Chaoren
Wang Chenzhai
Wang Fengxiu
Xia Songling
Zhang Donghai
Zhao Shikui

In general, Liang style appears somewhat similar to both Yin and Cheng styles; most Liang style practitioners are concentrated in Beijing.

As its technical basis, Liang style Baguazhang has the "Eight Mother Palms" (Ding Shi Ba Zhang) and the "Eight Changing Palms" (Ba Da Zhang aka Lao Ba Zhang), from which more complicated linking forms are derived like the "Dragon Form" (Long Xing Zhang), "64 Linear Palms" (Liushisi Shou Zhang), "Linking Palms" (Lian Huan Zhang) and "Eight Directions Palms" (Ba Mian Zhang). Liang style is also known for its large array of weapons: Big Broadsword, Straight Sword, Spear, Rooster Knives, Chicken Claw Knives, Mandarin Duck Knives, Crescent Moon Knives (aka Deer Horn Knives), Kun Lun Fan, Yin Yang Pen Brush, Steel "Yo-Yo" Meteors, Seven Star Rod, Wind and Fire Rings.

External links

Interview with Mr. Ma Chuanxu, Liang Style Baguazhang expert from Beijing and president of the Beijing Baguazhang Research Association
Ji Ben Gong, foundation exercises
Single and Double Palm Changes, Ba Da Zhang
Li Ziming 100th Year Memorial Celebration

References

Baguazhang styles
Neijia